is a town in Kuga District, Yamaguchi Prefecture, Japan.

As of 2016, the town has an estimated population of 6,338 and a density of 600 persons per km². The total area is 10.56 km².

Geography

Neighbouring municipalities 

 Yamaguchi Prefecture
 Iwakuni
 Hiroshima Prefecture
 Ōtake

Transportation

Railway 

 JR West
 San'yō Main Line: Waki Station

Highway 
Japan National Route 2 passes through the east side of Waki and travels near the eastern side of Waki Station.

Sister cities 
Waki has had a sister city relationship with the city of Eniwa, Hokkaido, since 1979, as a symbol of mass immigration of Waki residents to Eniwa in around 1886.

Sources

External links

Waki official website 

Towns in Yamaguchi Prefecture